Jin Park (born 12 October 1979) is a South Korean professional golfer.

Park was born in Seoul, South Korea. He attended Arizona State University where he earned a degree in political science. Shortly after, he turned pro in 2001.

Park has competed on the PGA Tour, Web.com Tour, and Asian Tour. He played on the PGA Tour in 2008 and 2013 after successfully completing qualifying school. His best finish was T18 at the 2008 John Deere Classic. He has played on the Web.com Tour since 2006 with his best finish T2 at the 2010 Melwood Prince George's County Open. He has had a total of 11 top-10 finishes on the Web.com Tour during his career. His best finish on the Asian Tour was 4th at the 2007 Barclays Singapore Open.

Professional wins
2003 Northern California PGA Championship

See also
2007 PGA Tour Qualifying School graduates
2012 PGA Tour Qualifying School graduates

References

External links

South Korean male golfers
Arizona Wildcats men's golfers
PGA Tour golfers
Asian Tour golfers
Golfers from Seoul
1979 births
Living people